Whistling in Dixie is a 1942 American crime comedy film, the second of three starring Red Skelton as radio detective and amateur crime solver Wally Benton (also known as The Fox) and Ann Rutherford as his fiancée. The pair are called upon to solve a crime in the Southern United States. The film also re-introduces Rags Ragland, playing dual roles as twins, the mostly-reformed Chester, as well as his villainous brother from the first film.  The film turns into a romantic comedy mystery, complete with death traps, corrupt politicians and lost gold, ending with a frenetic fight at the end between Wally Benton and both of Rags Ragland's characters.

The film is a sequel to Whistling in the Dark and is followed by Whistling in Brooklyn.

Plot summary

Cast
 Red Skelton as Wally "The Fox" Benton
 Ann Rutherford as Carol Lambert
 George Bancroft as Sheriff Claude Stagg
 Guy Kibbee as Judge George Lee
 Diana Lewis as Ellamae Downs
 Peter Whitney as Frank V. Bailie
 Rags Ragland as Chester Conway
 Celia Travers as Hattie Lee
 Lucien Littlefield as Corporal Lucken
 Louis Mason as Deputy Lem
 Mark Daniels as Martin Gordon
 Pierre Watkin as Doctor
 Emmett Vogan as Radio Producer
 Hobart Cavanaugh as Mr. Panky

Reception
According to MGM records the film earned $1,066,000 in the US and Canada and $279,000 elsewhere, making a profit of $542,000.

References

External links

 
 
 
 

1942 films
1940s crime comedy films
1940s comedy mystery films
American crime comedy films
American black-and-white films
Films about radio people
Films directed by S. Sylvan Simon
Films scored by Lennie Hayton
Films set in the United States
Metro-Goldwyn-Mayer films
1942 comedy films
1940s American films